Pagnona is a comune (municipality) in the Province of Lecco in the Italian region Lombardy, located about  northeast of Milan and about  north of Lecco.

Pagnona borders the following municipalities: Casargo, Colico, Delebio, Piantedo, Premana, Tremenico.

References

Cities and towns in Lombardy
Valsassina